Ben Cohen may refer to:

 Ben Cohen (bridge) (1907–1971), English bridge player and author
 Ben Cohen (businessman) (born 1951), American businessman, co-founder of Ben & Jerry's
 Ben Cohen (rugby union) (born 1978), English LGBT activist and ex-rugby union player

See also
 Benjamin Cohen (disambiguation)
 Bennett Cohen (1890–1964), American screenwriter